Awesome may refer to:

Music
 Awesome (band), a Seattle-based American band
Awesome (The Temptations album) 2001
 Awesome (Marc Terenzi album),   2005  
 "Awesome", a song by Veruca Salt from Eight Arms to Hold You
 A'wesome, a Korean EP by Hyuna 2016

Film and Television
 Awesome (Chuck) or Devon Woodcomb, a fictional character from the TV series Chuck
 Awesome (video game), a 1990 science fiction action game for the Amiga and Atari ST
 Awesome Comics, an American comic book studio, 1997–2000
 Awesomeness (company), established as AwesomenessTV is a Los Angeles-based film and television studio

People
 Awesome Kong (born 1977), female American professional wrestler
 Mike Awesome (1965–2007), male American professional wrestler

Other
 Awesome (window manager), a dynamic window manager for the X Window System
 Awesome Foundation, a philanthropic organization

See also